General elections were held in the Faroe Islands on 1 September 2015. Elections for the Danish Folketing were held beforehand on 18 June.

Background
On 4 August 2015 the Løgting passed a motion that criticized Prime Minister Kaj Leo Johannesen and former Minister of the Interior Kári P. Højgaard, accusing Johannesen of lying to the Løgting in connection with a 1 million kroner break fee clause in the contract led by the Copenhagen Infrastructure Partners to build a sub-sea tunnel between Eysturoy and Streymoy.

Although Kaj Leo Johannesen had previously told the Løgting that he had no part of the break fee, a judicial inquiry led by Hans Gammeltoft-Hansen (the Danish ombudsman from 1987 until 2012) confirmed in June 2015 that Kaj Leo Johannesen had knowingly misled the Løgting on several occasions, thereby breaking the law. For some time not much happened, the Prime Minister refused to take any action but went on holiday for a month. The speaker of the Løgting refused to assemble parliament, which had no scheduled meeting before 29 July 2015.

On 29 July Kaj Leo Johannesen gave his annual Ólavsøka speech to the Løgting, ending it by calling general elections. A week later on 4 August, the Løgting assembled to discuss the Johannesen's speech, as the law requires. All 33 members of the Løgting voted yes, including Højgaard. Republic and Progress then demanded a vote of no confidence in Kaj Leo Johannesen, in which 14 MPs voted for the motion, 9 against it and 10 cast blank votes, short of the majority of 17 required to pass the motion. Only 9 of 20 MPs from Kaj Leo Johannesen's coalition chose to back him and voted against the motion, including six from his own party, the Speaker Jógvan á Lakjuni from the People's Party and the two MPs from the Centre Party. However, three Union Party MPs cast blank votes, including Deputy Chairman Bárður Nielsen, whilst People's Party chairman Jákup Mikkelsen voted for the motion.

Kaj Leo Johannesen maintains that he did not lie, but only gave incorrect information to the Løgting.

Electoral system
Seats were allocated using the d'Hondt method.

Opinion polls

The ruling centre-right coalition led by Johannesen was consistently behind in the polls, while the Social Democrats led by Aksel Johannesen were well ahead. However, polls closer to election day showed a tightening race.

Vote

Seats

Results
The opposition parties made a major comeback from the 2011 elections, with the Social Democratic Party and Republic gaining two and one seats respectively. Progress regained its second seat, which it lost in 2011 when Janus Rein left the party. Despite a small reduction in their vote share, New Self-Government gained one seat.

Of the 117 void votes, 76 were blank and 41 invalid.

By region and polling district

There were 58 polling districts (down from 60 in 2011), of which 56 were towns and two (Giljanes and Fossanes) were schools. Giljanes was one of the two polling places on the western island of Vágar, while Fossanes is located on the Norðoyar. There were two polling places in the capital area; Tórshavn, which includes the suburbs of Hvítanes and Hoyvík, and the southern suburb Argir. The Vágar region includes the neighbouring island Mykines and the Sandoy region includes Skúvoy, while the rest of Streymoy includes the polling places on the islets Nólsoy and Hestur.

See also
List of members of the Løgting, 2015–19

References

Elections in the Faroe Islands
Faroes
2015 in the Faroe Islands
September 2015 events in Europe